A Multi Use Games Area (abbreviated MUGA) is usually a steel anti vandal outdoor fenced area with built in goal post units for various types of sports games, such as football, basketball or tennis. The outer fencing makes it easier to keep the ball in play. MUGAs are often installed at schools. MUGAs can be supplied in Half court (Open one end with one combination goal unit), Full court (Fully enclosed with two end goal units) and Key area (Open single goal end with key line markings).

MUGAs are often supplied as ready-made solutions by various manufacturers. Sports MUGAs usually consist of a steel goal post and basketball goal post combination. This can be senior, junior or match quality for basketball. Sports played on MUGAs are varied, hence the term Multi Use. Basketball, football, hockey, netball, and volleyball are usually provided for with appropriate floor line markings for each sport, which are lined in different coloured paints. Multi Use Games Area MUGAs are placed into the ground around a sports surface area including natural grass, artificial sports surfaces, sports tiles, tarmac or concrete. Some MUGAs are open ended, partially closed or fully enclosed. Sizes vary from Key Area 6m x 7.5m. Tarmac key lined. Half Court 7.5m x 15m. Full Court 15m x 30m.

The intense activity in a MUGA can increase noise and complaints from neighbours. The noise level depends on the material used for the fencing, and by the location. Positive results from United Kingdom local authorities can provide good evidence that placements of anti vandal Multi Use Games Areas can reduce anti social behaviour and increase fitness within early teen age groups in both cities and parish localities. Multi Use Games Areas (MUGA) can include the production of goal posts, target panels, fencing and seating. They are ideal for the urban areas that would benefit from a contained area in which children can play safely. A MUGA can encourage people to explore the potential of different sports in a safe environment, built solely for that purpose.

References

Sports venues